The Evangelical Baptist Church is an historic church located at 23 Chapel Street, in the village of Nonantum in Newton, Massachusetts. Built in 1873 in Gothic Revival style, it was designed by noted Boston architect Charles Edward Parker, who had in 1853 designed what today is the Architects Building of the Boston Society of Architects at 52 Broad Street, Boston. Evangelical Baptist Church was added to the National Register of Historic Places on September 4, 1986.

The Evangelical Baptist Church is still an active congregation.

See also
 National Register of Historic Places listings in Newton, Massachusetts

References

External links
 Evangelical Baptist Church of Newton web page

National Register of Historic Places in Newton, Massachusetts
Churches on the National Register of Historic Places in Massachusetts
Baptist churches in Massachusetts
Gothic Revival church buildings in Massachusetts
Churches completed in 1873
19th-century Baptist churches in the United States
Churches in Newton, Massachusetts
Stone churches in Massachusetts